The following is a timeline of the history of the city of Billings, Montana, USA.

Prior to 20th century
 1877 - Homesteaders arrive.
 1882
 Billings Depot built.
 Billings Herald newspaper begins publication.
 Billings Cemetery established.
 1883
 Coulson-Billings street railway begins operating.
 Billings Fire Brigade organized.
 1885 - Billings Daily Gazette newspaper begins publication.
 1889 - Town becomes part of new State of Montana.
 1891 - The Weekly Times newspaper begins publication.

20th century
 1901 - Public Library established.
 1902 - Billings and Northern Railroad in operation.
 1903 - Moss Mansion (residence) built.
 1904 - Northern Hotel in business.
 1906 - Babcock Theater built.
 1908 - Billings Polytechnic founded.
 1910
 Masonic Temple (Billings, Montana) built.
 Population: 10,031.
 1912 - Billings and Central Montana Railway in operation.
 1917 - Cereal Food Processor Building constructed.
 1927 - Eastern Montana Normal School founded.
 1928 - Billings Municipal Airport begins operating.
 1929 - Yale Oil refinery begins operating.
 1931 - Fox Theater opens.
 1932 - Cobb Field baseball park opens.
 1935 - Intermountain Union College relocated to Billings (approximate date).
 1937 - Pictograph Cave excavation begins near city.
 1944 - St. Patrick's High School established.
 1947
 Rocky Mountain College established.
 Carter Oil Company refinery built near Billings.
 1948 - Billings Mustangs baseball team formed.
 1950
 Billings Symphony Orchestra founded.
 Shrine Auditorium built.
 Population: 31,834.
 1953 - Billings Studio Theater company founded.
 1957 - Yellowstone County Courthouse built.
 1958 - June 2: Tornado.
 1962 - Kampgrounds of America headquartered in Billings.
 1964 - Yellowstone Art Center opens.
 1971 - Western Heritage Center opens.
 1974 - Sage Tower built.
 1975
 Montana Entertainment Trade and Recreation Arena opens.
 Granite Tower built.
 Rimrock Mall in business.
 1977 - Norwest Bank built.
 1980
 Sheraton Hotel built.
 City covered in ash from 1980 eruption of Mount St. Helens.
 Population: 66,798.
 1982 - Rocky Plaza condos built.
 1985 - First Interstate Center built.
 1986 - Flag of Billings, Montana design adopted.
 1988 - City filled with smoke from Yellowstone fires of 1988.
 1990 - Population: 81,151.
 1992 - December 18: Airplane crash.
 1993 - Billings Bulls ice hockey team formed.
 1994 - Montana Women's Prison in operation.
 1995 - ZooMontana opens.
 1996 - Charles Tooley becomes mayor.
 1999
 Four Dances Natural Area acquired by US Bureau of Land Management.
 City website online.
 Mormon Temple dedicated.

21st century

2000
Population: 89,847
 2002 - Skypoint awning/sculpture installed.
 2007 - Billings Dharma Center dedicated.
 2008 - Dehler Park (stadium) opens.
 2009
 Magic City Rollers roller derby league formed.
 Tom Hanel becomes mayor.
 2010
 June 20: 2010 Billings tornado.
 Population: 104,170.
 2011 - July: Oil pipeline bursts near city.
2017
Bill Cole becomes mayor

See also

Billings Metropolitan Area
Crow Indian Reservation, established 1868
History of Montana
List of mayors of Billings, Montana
Media in Billings, Montana
Sections of Billings, Montana
State of Montana
Territory of Montana
Timeline of Montana history
Timeline of pre-statehood Montana history

References

Bibliography

 
 
 
  + Chronology

 Kliewer, Waldo O. "The Foundations of Billings, Montana." Pacific Northwest Quarterly 31.3 (1940): 255-283. online

 Van West, Carroll. Capitalism on the frontier: Billings and the Yellowstone Valley in the nineteenth century (U of Nebraska Press, 1993) online.

  (fulltext via Open Library)
 
 Hardt, Mark D. "The Emergence of a Competitive Core: Bifurcation Dynamics in Billings, Montana." in Downtowns: Revitalizing the Centers of Small Urban Communities (2013).

External links

 Items related to Billings, various dates (via Digital Public Library of America).
 Materials related to Billings, various dates (via US Library of Congress, Prints & Photos Division).

Years in Montana
 
Billings
billings
billings